Johannes Hendrik Stander (born 8 September 1993 in George, South Africa) is a South African rugby union player who last played for the . His regular position is lock.

Career

Youth

Golden Lions

After finishing high school, Stander moved to Johannesburg to join the  academy prior to the 2012 season. He featured in all thirteen of the  side's matches during the 2012 Under-19 Provincial Championship; he scored one try against his former side  in their 46–5 victory in George and scored a hat-trick in the return leg between the sides in an 83–3 victory in Johannesburg.

SWD Eagles

He made six appearances for them during the 2014 Vodacom Cup competition and scoring his first senior try, an effort right before half-time in a 51–7 victory over Kenyan invitational side .

Still eligible to play at Under-21 level, he also started five of the s matches during the 2014 Under-21 Provincial Championship. He helped them reach the title play-offs and started their 40–33 semi-final victory against  in Wellington.

Personal

References

South African rugby union players
Living people
1993 births
People from George, South Africa
Rugby union flankers
Rugby union number eights
Golden Lions players
SWD Eagles players
Rugby union players from the Western Cape